The City of Victoria, often called Victoria City or simply Victoria, was the de facto capital of Hong Kong during its time as a British dependent territory. It was initially named Queenstown but was soon known as Victoria. It was one of the first urban settlements in Hong Kong and its boundaries are recorded in the Laws of Hong Kong. All government bureaux and many key departments still have their head offices located within its limit.

Present-day Central is at the heart of Victoria City. Although the city expanded over much of what is now Kennedy Town, Shek Tong Tsui, Lung Fu Shan, Sai Ying Pun, Sheung Wan, Wan Chai, Happy Valley, the Mid-Levels, East Point and parts of Causeway Bay, the name Victoria has been eclipsed by Central in popular usage. However, the name is still used in places such as Victoria Park, Victoria Peak, Victoria Harbour, Victoria Prison, and a number of roads and streets. It is also retained in the names of various organisations such as the Victoria City District of the Hong Kong Scout, and the Victoria Junior Chamber. The name Victoria District Court had been used into the 1980s, when it was moved to the Wanchai Tower and combined with other district courts in the territory.

History

In 1857, the British government expanded the scope of Victoria City and divided it into four wans. The four wans are Sai Wan ("West Ring" in Chinese, present-day Sai Wan, including Kennedy Town, Shek Tong Tsui, and Sai Ying Pun), Sheung Wan ("Upper Ring" in Chinese, present-day Sheung Wan), Choong Wan or Chung Wan ("Central Ring" in Chinese, present-day Central) and Ha Wan ("Lower Ring" in Chinese, present-day Wan Chai). "Sai Wan", "Sheung Wan" and "Choong Wan" retain the same name in Chinese today.

The four wans are further divided into nine yeuks (similar to "district" or "neighbourhood"). The coverage also included parts of East Point and Happy Valley (West of Wong Nai Chung Road on the east side of the racecourse).  In 1903, boundary stones were established to mark the city's boundary and six of them are still preserved today. The stones spread from Causeway Bay to Kennedy Town.

In the 1890s, Victoria extended four miles west to east along the coastal strip. Buildings were made of granite and brick.  Buses and the new tramway would become the main form of transportation in the area.

The city is centred in present-day Central, and named after Queen Victoria in 1843. It occupies the areas known in modern times as Central, Admiralty, Sheung Wan, Wan Chai, East Point, Shek Tong Tsui, the Mid-levels, the Peak, Happy Valley, Tin Hau, and Kennedy Town, on Hong Kong Island.

Boundaries

The city boundaries are defined in the laws of Hong Kong as follows:

On the north – The Harbour;
On the west – A line running due north and south drawn through the north-west angle of Inland Lot No. 1299 and extending southwards a distance of 850 feet from the aforesaid angle;
On the south – A line running due east from the southern extremity of the western boundary until it meets a contour in the vicinity of the Hill above Belchers 700 feet above principal datum, that is to say, a level 17.833 feet below the bench-mark known as "Rifleman's Bolt", the highest point of a copper bolt set horizontally in the east wall of the Royal Navy Office and Mess Block Naval Dockyard, and thence following the said contour until it meets the eastern boundary;
Thence along the west side of Moreton Terrace to the south-east corner of Inland Lot No. 1580 and produced in a straight line for 80 feet, and thence along the north side of Cotton Path and produced until it meets the west side of Wong Nei Chong Road on the east side of Wong Nei Chong Valley and thence to the south-east angle of Inland Lot No. 1364, produced until it meets the southern boundary.

Boundary stones 
In 1903, the Hong Kong Government erected several boundary stones to mark the limits of Victoria, measuring 98 cm in height, tapered at the top and with the inscription "City Boundary 1903". As the city’s boundaries were clearly defined by ordinance, these stones were more just physical markers.

Three additional boundary stones were found in 2021, adding the total of discovered stones to 10, including the one disappeared in June 2007.

Districts

Also called yeuks.
Kennedy Town, Hong Kong
Shektongtsui
Sai Ying Poon
Taipingshan – a neighborhood near Sheung Wan that shared its name with Victoria Peak
Sheung Wan
Choong Wan (known in modern times as Central in English)
Ha Wan (today's Admiralty)
Wan Chai
Bowrington (between today's Wan Chai and Causeway Bay; known also as Ngo Keng)
Soo Kun Po
Happy Valley
Causeway Bay

See also
 History of Hong Kong
 List of buildings, sites and areas in Hong Kong
 List of places named for Queen Victoria § Hong Kong, for a list of places named after Queen Victoria
 Praya

References

External links

 Boundary of the City of Victoria as defined in Hong Kong Laws, Cap 1 SCHED 1 of Hong Kong Law
Article on history of Hong Kong 
Photos of the 1903 boundary stones
A article on the "four wans and nine yeuks" in Chinese (Adobe PDF format)
Another article on "four wans and nine yeuks" 
A photographic panorama of the water-front and city of Victoria, taken sometime after 1906, in Cambridge Digital Library

 
Central, Hong Kong
Central and Western District, Hong Kong
Hong Kong Island
Populated coastal places in Hong Kong
Populated places established in 1842
1842 establishments in Hong Kong
Populated places in Hong Kong